is a Japanese football player. He plays for Gainare Tottori.

Career
Ryota Inoue joined the J2 League club "Gainare Tottori" in 2013.

References

External links

1990 births
Living people
National Institute of Fitness and Sports in Kanoya alumni
Association football people from Tokyo
Japanese footballers
J2 League players
J3 League players
Gainare Tottori players
Association football goalkeepers